Elachista infamiliaris is a moth in the family Elachistidae. It was described by László Anthony Gozmány in 1957. It is found in Hungary.

References

Moths described in 1957
infamiliaris
Moths of Europe